Major General Sir (Henry) Cecil Lowther,  (1 January 1869 – 1 November 1940) was a British general and Conservative politician, big-game hunter and adventurer.

Career
Born in Ampthill, Bedfordshire, he was the fourth son of William Lowther.

Educated at Clifton College, he was commissioned into the Scots Guards as a second lieutenant on 29 December 1888, promoted to lieutenant on 13 April 1892, and to captain on 24 June 1899. When the Second Boer War broke out in October 1899, the 1st battalion of the Scots Guards departed Ireland for South Africa to join up with the 1st Guards Brigade, with Lowther appointed adjutant. They reached that country in November, and immediately saw action in the battles of Belmont and Modder River, both British victories, though at a heavy cost in British life. In December, the battalion was present at the Battle of Magersfontein, and the following year took part in the march to take the Boer capitals of Bloemfontein and Pretoria. After taking the latter city, the 1st Guards Brigade took part in the Battle of Diamond Hill (June 1900), and in the last large scale battle of the war at Bergendal in August 1900. The war then became a guerrilla war, and Lowther was on 20 July 1901 appointed to a staff position as Staff Captain for Intelligence. For his service in the war, Lowther received the Queen's South Africa Medal, was appointed a Companion of the Distinguished Service Order (DSO), and was noted for future staff employment.

After the war had ended, Lowther was back as a regular officer in the 1st battalion of his regiment in September 1902, but three months later was seconded for a Staff appointment as Brigade Major, Foot Guards brigade in the 1st Army Corps on 3 December 1902.

In October 1913, on the eve of World War I, he commanded 1st Battalion Scots Guards until being wounded in November 1914. He then commanded 1st (Guards) Brigade, which was broken up in August 1915, and afterwards became Military Secretary at General Headquarters France. On 24 February 1916 he received the Légion d'honneur, class of Commandeur, and in the Birthday Honours of 1918 he was appointed Knight Commander of the Order of St Michael and St George.

Lowther was elected as Member of Parliament (MP) for Appleby at a by-election in 1915, but the constituency was abolished in 1918. In 1921 Lowther returned to Parliament as MP for Penrith and Cockermouth succeeding his brother James, who had held the seat since 1886 and been the Speaker since 1905, became Viscount Ullswater, but lost the seat in the 1922 general election to the Liberal Levi Collison. He did not attempt to return to politics.

He was elected a Fellow of the Royal Geographical Society on 11 November 1901. In 1912, he published From Pillar to Post, an account of his travels. In 1925, he co-authored The Scots Guards in the Great War, 1914–1918.

He died in Basingstoke, Hampshire aged 71.

Family
He had married late, on 28 June 1920, to Dorothy Maude Isabel Harvey, a widow of Gordon Bois. There were no children.

References

External links 
 

1869 births
1940 deaths
British Army major generals
Military personnel from Bedfordshire
British Army generals of World War I
People educated at Clifton College
Commanders of the Royal Victorian Order
Companions of the Distinguished Service Order
Companions of the Order of the Bath
Conservative Party (UK) MPs for English constituencies
Fellows of the Royal Geographical Society
Knights Commander of the Order of St Michael and St George
Scots Guards officers
UK MPs 1910–1918
UK MPs 1918–1922
Commandeurs of the Légion d'honneur
People from Basingstoke
People from Ampthill
Cecil